Vorlygino is a rural locality (a village) in Pyatovskoye Rural Settlement, Totemsky  District, Vologda Oblast, Russia. The population was 21 as of 2002.

Geography 
Vorlygino is located 2 km northwest of Totma (the district's administrative centre) by road. Pyatovskaya is the nearest rural locality.

References 

Rural localities in Tarnogsky District